Mníšek nad Popradom (Mnyshok) is a village and municipality in Stará Ľubovňa District in the Prešov Region of northern Slovakia.

History
In historical records the village was first mentioned in 1323.

Geography
The municipality lies at an altitude of 390 metres and covers an area of 17.789 km2. It has a population of about 682 people. The village lies near the Poprad river and is directly at the border with Poland, with a 24-hour border crossing.

External links
http://www.statistics.sk/mosmis/eng/run.html

Villages and municipalities in Stará Ľubovňa District